The 1887–88 season  was the 15th Scottish football season in which Dumbarton competed at a national level.

Scottish Cup

Following an easy first round victory, Dumbarton were knocked out of the Scottish Cup at the second round stage by their old rivals Vale of Leven.

Dumbartonshire Cup

Following an easy win in the second round, Dumbarton lost to Renton in the third round.

Glasgow Charity Cup

A good win was achieved in the first round against 3rd LRV, but Cambuslang were to prove too strong in the semi final replay, after a 1-1 draw.

Friendlies

Dumbarton's fixture list during the season grew to its largest so far with 43 'friendly' matches being played.  This included home and away ties against Rangers, Hibernian, Vale of Leven, Partick Thistle, Morton, Port Glasgow and 3rd LRV, a match against Renfrewshire Cup holders Abercorn, and a 4 match tour of the north of Scotland during the New Year holidays. In addition 6 matches were played against English opposition with mixed results.  In all, 23 were won, 4 drawn and 16 lost, scoring 134 goals and conceding 98.

Player statistics
Of note amongst those donning the club's colours for the first time were Duncan Stewart and John Bell.
At the same time the club's squad was depleted by the loss four internationalists:
- Robert 'Plumber' Brown and Joe Lindsay moved to local rivals Dumbarton Athletic. James McAulay emigrated to Burma and Billy Robertson also heading for 'pastures new'.
In addition after returning from a short spell with Bolton Wanderers, Jock Hutcheson left the club for the final time.

Only includes appearances and goals in competitive Scottish Cup matches.

Source:

International caps

An international trial match was played on 18 February 1888 to consider selection of teams to represent Scotland in the upcoming games in the 1888 British Home Championship. Leitch Keir was selected to take part.

Subsequently, four Dumbarton players were selected to play for Scotland as follows:

- Geordie Dewar and Duncan Stewart earned their first caps and Ralph Aitken earned his second cap against Ireland. Both Dewar and Aitken scored in the 10-2 win over the Irish.

- Leitch Keir earned his fifth cap against England.

Representative matches
Dumbarton players were selected to play in Dumbartonshire county XI's as follows:

In addition:

- Leitch Keir was selected to play in a Scots Anglo XI against a Scots Welsh XI on 26 May 1888. The 'English' XI won 4-3.

- Geordie Dewar was selected to play in a Scottish Internationalists XI against Perthshire and Aberdeenshire on 20 and 21 April respectively.

Reserve team
Dumbarton were defeated in the second round of the Scottish Second XI Cup by Vale of Leven.

In the Dumbartonshire Second XI Cup competition, Dumbarton lost out in the semi final to Renton.

References

Dumbarton F.C. seasons
Scottish football clubs 1887–88 season